The Arnabol Viaduct carries the West Highland Line over the Arnabol Burn.

History

Design
The viaduct carries the single track line over the Arnabol Burn, and has a slight curve to the south.

References

Sources
 

Railway bridges in Scotland
Listed bridges in Scotland
Lochaber
Bridges in Highland (council area)
Bridges completed in 1901
1901 establishments in Scotland